Ice Breaker is a launched steel roller coaster located at SeaWorld Orlando in Orlando, Florida. Originally scheduled to open for the 2020 season, its opening was delayed indefinitely due to the COVID-19 pandemic.

History
In September 2019, SeaWorld Orlando revealed the name for the roller coaster, Ice Breaker. In November 2019, SeaWorld Orlando revealed the trains for the roller coaster at the International Association of Amusement Parks and Attractions (IAAPA) Exposition. In February 2020, the track work for the ride was completed.

In January 2022, it was announced that Ice Breaker would open on February 18, 2022. The height requirement was adjusted from 48 inches to 54 inches a day after opening. Following the removal of the ride's "comfort collars" during a maintenance period, the ride reopened on March 11, 2023 with its height requirement lowered back down to 48 inches.

References

Roller coasters in Florida
Roller coasters introduced in 2022
SeaWorld Orlando
2022 establishments in Florida